Daniel Richter may refer to:

Daniel Richter (actor) (born 1939), American mime, actor and choreographer
Daniel Richter (artist) (born 1962), German artist 
Daniel Richter (singer), Canadian singer, member of band Eleven Past One
Daniel K. Richter, American historian